To Whom It May Concern may refer to:
Salutation (greeting), used for opening a letter to an unknown recipient

In music 
 Albums
 To Whom It May Concern (Bee Gees album), 1972
 To Whom It May Concern, a Blacklite District album, 2016
 To Whom It May Concern..., a 1991 Freestyle Fellowship album
 To Whom It May Concern (Lisa Marie Presley album), 2003
 To Whom It May Concern (Nat King Cole album), 1959
 To Whom It May Concern (Splender album), 2002
 To Whom It May Concern (The Pasadenas album), 1988
 To Whom It May Concern (Oscar Lang album), 2018

 Songs
 "To Whom It May Concern", a 2011 song by American rock band Journey, from the album Eclipse
 "To Whom It May Concern", a song and single by the British band Million Dead
 "To Whom It May Concern", a song by American rock band Creed, which appears on The Scorpion King soundtrack
 "To Whom It May Concern", a song by American metalcore band Underoath, which appears on their album Define the Great Line
 "To Whom It May Concern", a song by American-Mexican folk musician Sixto Rodriguez
 "To Whom it May Concern", a song by Yelawolf, a Shady records artist affiliated with southern rap/hip-hop
 "To Whom It May Concern", a song by English new wave band Duran Duran
 "To Whom It May Concern", a song by Australian metalcore band Capture

 Other uses
 To whom it may concern., an independent record label started by Swedish electronic music project iamamiwhoami

Other uses 
To Whom It May Concern, a 1970s musical by Carol Hall
"To Whom It May Concern", an anti-war poem by Adrian Mitchell